Rodney Slatford OBE (born 18 July 1944) is an English contemporary double bass player and teacher. He was the principal bass player of the Midland Sinfonia, Academy of St. Martin in the Fields, and English Chamber Orchestra, a founder of the Nash Ensemble, and has been a principal player in other early music ensembles. He is also a publisher of sheet music for double bass. He had studied with Adrian Beers and wrote his obituary in The Independent.

Notes

External links
Yorkedition.co.uk

English classical double-bassists
Male double-bassists
Living people
1944 births
Place of birth missing (living people)
21st-century double-bassists
21st-century British male musicians